Tuntang is an administrative district, and a town within that district, in Semarang Regency of Central Java Province, Indonesia. The Dutch built a railway station in the town. The district covers 56.242 sq.km. The total population for the Tuntang district was 60,392 in 2010 and had grown to 66,573 in mid 2018. The geographical coordinates for Tuntang are -7 16' 06'' (-7.268) latitude and 110 27' 16'' (110.454) longitude. The altitude at Tuntang is 700 m above sea level.

References

http://www.tageo.com/index-e-id-v-07-d-m3752464.htm

Semarang Regency
Districts of Central Java
Populated places in Central Java